

The Autoped was an early motor scooter or motorized scooter manufactured by the Autoped Company of Long Island City, New York from 1915 to 1922.

The driver stood on a platform with 10-inch tires and operated the machine using only the handlebars and steering column, pushing them forward to engage the clutch, using a lever on the handlebar to control the throttle, and pulling the handlebars and column back to disengage the clutch and apply the brake. After riding, the steering column would be folded onto the platform to store the scooter more easily. The engine was an air-cooled, 4-stroke, 155 cc engine over the front wheel. The bike came with a headlamp and tail lamp, a Klaxon horn, and a toolbox. It was quite efficient, but was not widely distributed.

A patent for the Autoped as a "self-propelled vehicle" was applied for in July 1913 and granted in July 1916. An early description of the Autoped described it as having a hollow steering column that acted as the fuel tank.  However, the production version had a fuel tank above the front mudguard.

The Autoped went out of production in the United States in 1921, but was manufactured by Krupp in Germany from 1919 to 1922.

See also 
 List of motorcycles of the 1910s
 Moped
 Personal transporter

References

Bibliography

External links 
 

Motorcycle manufacturers of the United States
Scooter manufacturers
Motorcycles introduced in the 1910s
Personal transporters